The Falls Creek Alpine Resort is an alpine ski resort in the Hume region in northeastern Victoria, Australia.

The resort is an unincorporated area, directly administered by the government of Victoria, and surrounded by the Alpine Shire.

Alpine resort

Falls Creek is beginner/intermediate friendly, with almost 80% of the resort dedicated to these types of skiers/snowboarders. However, Australia's notoriously fickle snow conditions ensure that snowmaking using the water from the nearby Rocky Valley Lake is sometimes, particularly early in the season, the main source of skiable snow. Consequently, like all Australian snowfields, Falls Creek's customer base is almost entirely domestic, however many international cross country skiers travel to Falls Creek for the Kangaroo Hoppet, Australia's Worldloppet event on the last Saturday of August and international snowboarders to Stylewars, The Australian Slopestyle Championships and Australia's highest sanctioned TTR World Tour event held in the first week of September.

The resort features 4,500 accommodation beds, and consequently a large number of restaurants, bars, and nightclubs to amuse the guests at night.  Some apartments are privately owned, but the resort's management requires that they must be available for hire when not occupied.

The resort also serves as a summer base to explore the national park surrounding the resort.

Falls Creek is accessible by the Bogong High Plains Road from Mount Beauty all year round, though like all of Australia's snow resorts snow chains must be carried during winter and fitted if directed.  The road continues across the High Plains and descends to meet the Omeo Highway north of the hamlet of Anglers Rest, however the route from this side is closed during the snow season.

In summer both routes are popular with cyclists, and various cycling events are held that involve climbing to the resort, including the popular SCODY 3 Peaks Challenge (recently renamed to Falls Creek Peaks Challenge).

Quick Statistics
 Highest elevation: 
 Highest lifted elevation: 
 Village elevation: 
 Number of lifts: 16

In winter
 Snowline elevation: 
 Average yearly snowfall: 
 Average days open in winter: 128

Alpine
 Number of Runs: 76+
 Longest advanced run: Wishing Well, 
 Longest beginner run: Wombats Ramble, 
 Terrain mix: 17%  beginner, 60%  intermediate, 23%  advanced
 Total lift length: 8.1km
 Lift capacity: 28,392 Passengers/hour
Cross country
 Number of trails: 21
 Groomed trail network: 
 Longest trail: Rocky Valley Dam Loop, 
 Terrain mix: Beginner 33% , Intermediate 48% , Advanced 19%

Lift network

History 
After World War II, the Kiewa electrical scheme was started in the Kiewa River valley by the State Electricity Commission of Victoria. On land previously used only for summer cattle grazing in the natural alpine grasslands, the first ski lodge was built in 1948 by workers from the scheme. The first lift, a rope tow, was built in 1951 and the first chairlift in Australia was constructed there in 1957.

The high plains in the area were used for summer cattle grazing from 1851 until 2005, when the Government of Victoria did not renew grazing licences due to concerns about the cattle's impact on the fragile alpine environment. Some of the cattlemen's huts still survive and are a tourist attraction in summer. Mount Bogong, Victoria's highest mountain, is nearby. The nearest town to Falls Creek is Mount Beauty.

In 2019, Vail Resorts announced the acquisition of Falls Creek and Hotham for AU$174 million, and today they operate three of the largest ski resorts in Australia, including Perisher Ski Resort in New South Wales.

Climate
Falls Creek has a Subantarctic climate (Dfc) with cool summers and cold, very snowy winters.

On February 3 2023, Falls Creek reached a top of just .

Proposed developments 
In 2009, the Falls Creek resort plan proposed replacing the Gully triple chair with a gondola, having a capacity of 1800 passengers per hour and a speed of up to 6 meters per second. This proposal also made its appearance in the 2016 masterplan, but nothing has resulted as of yet. It is worth noting that a gondola this short would considerably expensive, where it would be much more cost effective to replace a much longer lift.

Snowmaking 
In 2021, Falls Creek invested AU$1.88 million into snowmaking machines. These new TechnoAlpin guns were placed along Wombats Ramble, Main Street and at the base of Drovers Dream. These snow machines now accompany the older snowmaking technology along Ruined Castle and Main Street.

Notable seasons 
2022 saw unusually large snowfalls in June, resulting in an established snowpack before the start of the ski season. As a result of this, Falls Creek and many other resorts opened to visitors one week early, with a snow depth of over 75cm at beginning of June.

Notable racers
 Steven Lee, Olympic and World Cup alpine skier. Also a back-country tour guide for Falls Creek 
 Malcolm Milne (born 1948), World Cup alpine racer, learned to ski at Falls Creek
 Ross Milne (1944–1964), learned to ski at Falls Creek.
 Britteny Cox (born 1994), Australian Mogul Skier and the youngest athlete to compete at the Vancouver 2010 Olympic Winter Games. 2017 - World Champion, World Cup Moguls Crystal Globe Winner, World Cup Freestyle Overall Crystal Globe Winner

Notable snowboarders 
 Scott James (born 1994), Australian Snowboarder, Australia's youngest male Olympian in 50 years and the youngest male competitor at the Vancouver Games.

See also
 Skiing in Australia
 Mt Hotham
 Perisher

References

External links

 
 Falls Creek Ski Lifts Pty Ltd Site
 Falls Creek Terrain Park Site
 The Age - Falls Creek Corporate Ski Race Site
 Falls Creek Official Employment Site 
 Falls Creek Race Club Official Site
 Falls Creek snow report on ski.com.au
 Falls Creek Trailmap
 Falls Creek on wikiski.com
 Victorian Cross Country Ski Team 
 A list of all 40 lifts to operate at Falls Creek at the Australian ski lift directory.

Ski areas and resorts in Victoria (Australia)
Victorian Alps
Towns in Victoria (Australia)
Unincorporated areas of Victoria (Australia)
Merlin Entertainments Group